Jean Damman (born 17 October 1949) is a Belgian equestrian. He competed in two events at the 1972 Summer Olympics.

References

1949 births
Living people
Belgian male equestrians
Olympic equestrians of Belgium
Equestrians at the 1972 Summer Olympics
Place of birth missing (living people)